The Barrows (or Tumuli) of Tasmola are dispersed throughout central Kazakhstan in the Karaganda, Akmola, and Pavlodar regions.

Site description
Originating in the Saka period (7th to 3rd Centuries BC), the various barrows of the Tasmola culture can be found throughout the valleys of central Kazakhstan.  The sites are characterized by stone complexes with up to four stone barrows, menhirs (single or in groups), and two curved ranges that can each stretch 50 to 200 m long (unique to Tasmola structures).  The ranges appear to line up in accordance to equinoctial, solstitial or midsummer sunrise points.  Archaeological finds in the barrows themselves can include pottery, horse skeletons, and fire pit remains.  Over 300 of such barrows have been identified in Kazakhstan, of which only a small number have been archaeologically excavated.

World Heritage Status
This site was added to the UNESCO World Heritage Tentative List on September 24, 1998 in the Mixed (Cultural + Natural) category.
(see List of World Heritage Sites in Kazakhstan)

Notes

References
Barrows with stone ranges of the Tasmola culture - UNESCO World Heritage Centre Retrieved 2009-03-02.

World Heritage Sites in Kazakhstan
World Heritage Tentative List
Karaganda Region
Akmola Region
Iranian archaeological sites
Pavlodar Region
Saka